The Kazan rebellion or Tatar Rebellion (1552–1556) was an uprising against Tsardom of Russia. It aimed to restore the Kazan Khanate, which the Russians had conquered in October 1552.

The rebel armies mostly consisted of Tatars, Chuvash, Cheremises, Mordvins, and Udmurts. Some Nogais were also involved in the war. Independent rebel governments formed in Chalem and in Mishatamaq, the khan were invited from the Nogai Horde. Russian troops under Andrey Kurbsky and Alexander Gorbatyi-Shuisky opposed the "rebels".

At the peak of the rebellion Tatars controlled the greater part of the former khanate. However, the city of Kazan, the former capital, remained under Russian control. Ivan IV sent major reinforcements to the Kazan area and suppressed the uprising.

References and notes

Russo-Kazan Wars
1550s conflicts
History of Mari El
1550s in Europe
1550s in Russia
1552 in Russia
1553 in Russia
1554 in Russia
1555 in Russia
1556 in Russia